Skins is a British teen drama created by father-and-son television writers Bryan Elsley and Jamie Brittain for Company Pictures. The fourth series began airing on E4 on 28 January 2010 and ended on 18 March 2010. Like the previous series, this series follows the lives of the second generation, which consists of Effy Stonem, Pandora Moon, Thomas Tomone, James Cook, Freddie McClair, JJ Jones, Naomi Campbell, and twin sisters Emily and Katie Fitch.

Main cast

List of episodes

References

External links
List of 

Series 04
2010 British television seasons
Bipolar disorder in fiction

de:Liste der Skins-Episoden